Andrea Louisa Marcovicci (born November 18, 1948) is an American actress and singer.

Life and career 
Marcovicci was born in Manhattan, to Helen Stuart, a singer, and Eugen Marcovicci, a physician and internist of Romanian descent. Her father was 63 when she was born and died when she was 20. In her teens she decided that she wanted to be a singer, but instead majored in drama. In a 1972 interview, she looked back at this period without enthusiasm:

Marcovicci left school and started making her way into show business as a singer, appearing on The Mike Douglas Show and The Merv Griffin Show. As an actress, she debuted in commercials and soon became better known as Dr. Betsy Chernak Taylor on the television soap opera Love is a Many Splendored Thing from 1970 to 1973.  She appeared in the second pilot film for the television series Harry O, titled Smile Jenny, You're Dead. She was nominated for a Golden Globe award for the New Star of the Year in 1977 for the film, The Front (1976).

Marcovicci had a recurring role on Hill Street Blues. She has appeared on Scarecrow and Mrs. King, Kojak, The Incredible Hulk, Magnum, P.I., Cybill, Arli$$, Taxi, Voyagers! (as Cleopatra), Baretta, Mannix, and Friends and Lovers (TV series). She starred on both Trapper John, M.D. and Berrenger's.

Marcovicci appeared onstage on Broadway in Ambassador. Her film roles include The Front (1976), The Concorde ... Airport '79 (1979), Spacehunter: Adventures in the Forbidden Zone (1983) and Jack the Bear (1993).

In 2008 Marcovicci celebrated her 22nd season at the legendary Oak Room of the Algonquin Hotel with Marcovicci Sings Movies II. A very special 60th Birthday concert followed in May 2009 at Town Hall in NYC, celebrating Andrea's contribution to the American Songbook. To commemorate this event her personal record label, Andreasong Recordings, Inc., released a compilation CD titled As Time Goes By: The Best of Andrea Marcovicci, her 17th album and/or CD.

At the end of 2011, Marcovicci celebrated her 25th season at the Oak Room with "No Strings", a collection of songs about travel. Her closing performance of "No Strings" was the final cabaret event at the Oak Room, as the Algonquin's new owner decided to turn the space into a lounge for "preferred" customers.

Marcovicci celebrated her 65th birthday, November 18, 2013, by playing two shows at Joe's Pub, part of the Public Theater.

Awards 
She is the recipient of several awards and honors including the Mabel Mercer Foundation’s 2007 Mabel Award and three Lifetime Achievement Awards—honored by the Manhattan Association of Cabarets and Clubs, The Licia Albanese-Puccini Foundation, and by a Bob Harrington Backstage Bistro Award. In recognition of her accomplishments in the arts, Andrea has received honorary degrees from Trinity College in Hartford, CT and the Memphis College of Art. In addition, "The Andrea Marcovicci Suite" at the Algonquin Hotel, dedicated in 2006 on her twentieth anniversary at the Oak Room, contains memorabilia of her work in theatre, film, television, and on the concert stage.

Personal life 
She married actor Daniel Reichert in 1993. The couple separated in 2004, and are now divorced. They have a daughter, Alice Wolfe Reichert.

Partial filmography 
 Cry Rape (1973) (TV) - Betty Jenner
 Smile Jenny, You're Dead (1974 pilot for Harry O) (TV) - Jennifer English
 Thriller (1975) (TV) - Ruth Harrow
 The Front (1976) - Florence Barrett
 Kojak:’Once More From Birdland’ (1977) - Francesca Milano
 A Vacation In Hell  (1979) - Barbara
 The Concorde ... Airport '79 (1979) - Alicia Rogov
 The Hand (1981) - Anne Lansdale
 Taxi (1981) (TV) - Emily
 The Incredible Hulk  (1981) (TV) - Gail Weber
 Magnum, P.I. (1981) (TV) - Kendall Chase / Amy Crane / Carol Foster
 Hill Street Blues (1981) (TV) - Cynthia Chase ( 4 episodes)
 Kings and Desperate Men (1981) - Terrorist
 Spacehunter: Adventures in the Forbidden Zone (1983) - Chalmers
 The Stuff (1985) -  Nicole
 The Canterville Ghost (1986) - Lucy Canterville
 Someone to Love (1987) - Helen Eugene
 The Water Engine (1992) (TV) - Singer in dance hall
 Jack the Bear (1993) - Elizabeth Leary
 Irene in Time (2009) - Helen Dean
 Driving by Braille (2011) - Clare Robles
 Baskets (2019) (TV) - Tammy

Discography 
 Marcovicci Sings Movies (1987)
 I'll Be Seeing You: Love Songs of World War II (1991)
  December Songs (1992)
 What Is Love? (1992)
 Just Kern (1992)
 Always Irving Berlin (1995)
 New Words (1996)
 I Am Anne Frank (1997)
 Live from London (1998)
 Some Other Time: Sings Mabel Marcer (1998)
 Here There & Everywhere (2000)
 How's Your Romance? (2004)
 If I Were a Bell (2005)
 My Christmas Song for You (2007)
 Andrea Sings Astaire (2007)
 Sings Rodgers & Hart (2007)
 Smile (2012)

References

External links 
 
 

American women singers
American film actresses
American television actresses
American people of Romanian descent
American people of Serbian descent
Living people
People from Manhattan
Traditional pop music singers
Singers from New York City
Actresses from New York City
21st-century American women
1948 births